Halle Michelle Hazzard (born 4 February 1999) is a Grenadian sprinter and sister of Grenadian sprinter Payton Hazzard. She made her competitive debut for Grenada at the 2017 CARIFTA Games, where she earned a Silver medal and as well as a Bronze Medal in the 200m and 100m respectively. She then went to Grenada to compete in the  3rd OECS Track And Field Championships. At this meet she was able to secure two Bronze medals. One in the Women 100 Meter Dash OECS with a time of 11.76 seconds and another as part of Grenada's 4 × 100 m relay team which included Chelsea Mitchell, Jonair Thomas and Amanda Crawford.
On 14 February Halle broke the Grenadian 60m at the Tiger Paw Invite. She surpassed her UVA record-setting run of 7.31 from the week prior three times during the meet. She ran a time of 7.27 during the prelims before dropping the time in the semifinals with a 7.24 run. She closed the day with a time of 7.30 in the finals to finish fifth in the event. Her time ranks second in the ACC and 13th in the NCAA. Hazzard also captured a career-best time in the 200m dash. Her time of 23.79 ranks second in school history. She further lowered that time to 23.45 seconds in the prelims of the 2021 ACC Indoor Championships and moved to the #1 all time in the event for her school. She was also named as a Qualifier for the 2021 Indoor Championships in the 60m

Competition record

References

External links 
 
 Halle Hazzard at University of Virginia
 

1999 births
Living people
Grenadian female sprinters
Athletes (track and field) at the 2019 Pan American Games
Pan American Games competitors for Grenada
Virginia Cavaliers women's track and field athletes